Agustin Guerrero may refer to:

Agustín Guerrero, member of the 1883 provisional government of Ecuador
Agustin Guerrero (comics), fictional character and comic book superhero